The Sarapuí River is a river of São Paulo state in southeastern Brazil. It is a tributary of the Sorocaba River, which flows into the Tietê River, an important tributary of the Paraná River.

See also
List of rivers of São Paulo

References
IBGE

Rivers of São Paulo (state)